Out to Sea is a 1997 American romantic comedy film directed by Martha Coolidge and written by Robert Nelson Jacobs. It was the final film role of Donald O'Connor, Gloria DeHaven and Edward Mulhare, and the penultimate film of Jack Lemmon and Walter Matthau.

Plot
Compulsive gambler Charlie Gordon cons his brother-in-law, widower Herb Sullivan, whose wife Susie was Charlie's sister, into an all expenses-paid luxury Holland America Mexican cruise. The catch, which Charlie does not reveal to Herb until the ship has left port, is that they are required to work as dance hosts. They must sleep in a cramped cabin in the bowels of the ship, and if they do not dance, they will get fired and have to pay nearly $3,000 (later Herb finds out he has over $5,000) for the cruise or get thrown off the ship.

Ruled over by tyrannical, control-freak cruise director Gil Godwyn ("a song and dance man raised on a military base"), they do their best, despite Charlie's failed dance. Each meets a lady of interest. One is the luscious heiress Liz LaBreche, whose wealth attracts Charlie every bit as much as the rest of her does even though her wealth isn't real. The other is lovely widow Vivian who was a successful book editor and who is under the impression that Herb is really a doctor, not a dancer. Vivian came on board on the ship with her daughter and her newlywed husband to help her start dating again. After finally telling her the truth, Herb soon finds himself quite attracted to Vivian, and eventually the feeling becomes mutual. However, Herb is still very much in love with Susie which conflicts his very growing feelings for Vivian, leading him to eventually stand her up on the day that they were supposed to view the rare solar eclipse together. Charlie doesn't know that Liz is broke and came on board the ship to land a rich man.

Charlie literally drags ship owner Mrs. Carruthers across the dance floor in a clumsy manner, yet this surprisingly greatly pleases Mrs. Carruthers. Charlie sets up Mrs. Carruthers to meet Gil in the latter's room under difference circumstances that neither are true. He being told he's about to get a big promotion and her thinking he's romantically interested in her. This was set in motion to enable Charlie to continue his charade and he and Liz could spend the night together. During the eclipse, Charlie and Liz propose to each other and make plans to get married immediately. Liz's mom is ecstatic to having landed a rich guy, yet Liz has lost interest in how much money Charlie may have and is truly falling in love with him. However, Gil, figuring out that Charlie was in his room busts him in front of Liz and her mother who promptly dumps him and they decide to leave the cruise immediately. They make their getaway with Vivian on a plane.

Herb decides against starting a new relationship with Vivian until Charlie reminds him that Susie was "his" sister long before she was Herb's wife, emphasizing that Susie would never want Herb to spend the rest of his life completely alone and sad. Herb and Charlie, both realizing they are really in love with the women, decide to go after them. Herb and Charlie are preparing to launch a lifeboat to get off the ship. Gil finds them and Herb finally stands up to him and tells him off. This sets off Gil who goes on a total tirade as Herb and Charlie leave. However, Mrs. Carruthers is there with two other dance hosts and hears him say disparaging remarks about her. She promptly fires him, calling him an "asshole" and giving his job to one of the other dance hosts. Herb and Charlie find the plane trying to fly and call out to all to return. They set off a flare that Vivian sees and reminds him of a story he told her. The plane lands and everyone tells the truth about everything. Charlie and Liz continue dating, but Charlie makes some good money winning a poker game from a rich guy that he had originally torn up to impress Liz but later taped back together. Herb and Vivian are together as well.

Cast

Reception
On Rotten Tomatoes the film has a 36% rating based on 22 reviews, with an average rating of 5.3/10. On Metacritic, the film has a weighted average score of 49 out of 100, based on reviews from 14 critics, indicating "mixed or average reviews". Audiences surveyed by CinemaScore gave the film a grade of "B+" on scale of A+ to F.

The film received an unenthusiastic review from Janet Maslin in The New York Times. She described it as a "weak but genial romp." She credits Brent Spiner as a funny "scene-stealer" and says that Ms DeHaven is "almost as pretty" in this film as she was in Charlie Chaplin's Modern Times (1936), and says that Donald O'Connor's dancing "draw[s] a well-deserved round of applause". 
Joe Leydon of Variety wrote: "For the most part, Lemmon, like Matthau, recycles shtick from earlier, better pictures."

References

External links
 
 

1997 films
1997 romantic comedy films
American buddy comedy films
American romantic comedy films
1990s buddy comedy films
1990s English-language films
Films about old age
Films scored by David Newman
Films directed by Martha Coolidge
Films produced by John Davis
Films set on ships
Films with screenplays by Robert Nelson Jacobs
Seafaring films
Davis Entertainment films
20th Century Fox films
Films set in Mexico
1990s American films